Ellsworth Vines defeated Bunny Austin 6–4, 6–2, 6–0 in the final to win the gentlemen's singles tennis title at the 1932 Wimbledon Championships. Sidney Wood was the defending champion, but lost in the quarterfinals to Jiro Sato.

Seeds 

  Henri Cochet (second round)
  Ellsworth Vines (champion)
  Frank Shields (quarterfinals)
  Fred Perry (quarterfinals)
  Sidney Wood (quarterfinals)
  Bunny Austin (final)
  Jean Borotra (fourth round)
  Jack Crawford (semifinals)

Draw

Finals

Top half

Section 1

Section 2

Section 3

Section 4

Bottom half

Section 5

Section 6

Section 7

Section 8

References

External links

Men's Singles
Wimbledon Championship by year – Men's singles